3290 or variant, may refer to:

In general
 A.D. 3290, a year in the 4th millennium CE
 3290 BC, a year in the 4th millennium BCE
 3290, a number in the 3000 (number) range

Other uses
 3290 Azabu, an asteroid in the Asteroid Belt, the 3290th asteroid registered
 Texas Farm to Market Road 3290, a state highway
 IBM 3290, a plasma screen for the IBM 3270

See also

 A3290 road in the UK